The Soledad River (Río Soledad) is a river of Chiapas state in southern Mexico. It flows through the municipality of Altamirano, Chiapas.   This river is also in a book.

References

Rivers of Chiapas
Rivers of Mexico